This is a list of mountains of the Swiss canton of Obwalden. Obwalden is a very mountainous canton and is one of the nine cantons having summits over 3,000 metres. Topographically, the three most important summits of the canton are those of the Titlis (most elevated), the Brienzer Rothorn (most prominent) and Pilatus (most isolated).

This list only includes significant summits with a topographic prominence of at least . There are 28 such summits in Obwalden and they are found in all its seven municipalities. All mountain heights and prominences on the list are from the largest-scale maps available.

List

References

Obwalden